Josia megaera is a moth of the  family Notodontidae. It is found from Brazil to Venezuela.

Larvae have been reared on Turnera odorata.

External links
Species page at Tree of Life project

Notodontidae of South America
Moths described in 1787